Aleksandar Kovacevic (Serbian Cyrillic: Александар Ковачевић; born August 29, 1998) is an American tennis player of Serbian ancestry.

Kovacevic has a career high ATP singles ranking of world No. 102, achieved on 20 March 2023. He also has a career high ATP doubles ranking of world No. 259, achieved on 20 March 2023.

Career

2021: Turned Pro, Grand Slam qualifying debut 
Kovacevic made his Grand Slam qualifying debut at the US Open, where he advanced to the final round before falling to Argentine Marco Trungelliti.

2022: ATP debut, first win and semifinal, Top 200
Kovacevic made his Top 250 debut on July 25, 2022, as world No. 227 following a final showing at the 2022 Indy Challenger.

Kovacevic made his ATP main draw debut at the 2022 Korea Open, where he entered as a lucky loser. He recorded his first ATP tour level win defeating seventh seed and world No. 32 Miomir Kecmanović in the first round. Next he defeated Tseng Chun-hsin to reach his first ATP quarterfinal and Mackenzie McDonald to reach his first ATP semi-final. As a result he climbed 55 positions up and reached the top 200 in the rankings at world No. 167 on October 3, 2022.

2023: Maiden Challenger, Top 125 debut
He reached the top 125 on 6 February 2023, following his maiden Challenger title at the 2023 Cleveland Open.

Ranked No. 122 at the 2023 Delray Beach Open, he received a wildcard for his second ATP tour event, where he lost in the first round to Michael Mmoh in three sets.

ATP Challenger and ITF Futures finals

Singles 4 (2–2)

Doubles: 2 (0–2)

References

External links

1998 births
Living people
Illinois Fighting Illini men's tennis players
American male tennis players
21st-century American people
Tennis people from New York (state)